Justice Cobb may refer to:

Amasa Cobb, associate justice and chief justice of the Nebraska Supreme Court
Andrew J. Cobb, associate justice of the Supreme Court of Georgia
Kay B. Cobb, associate justice of the Supreme Court of Mississippi
Nelson Cobb, associate justice of the Kansas Supreme Court
Osro Cobb, associate justice of the Arkansas Supreme Court
Sue Bell Cobb, chief justice of the Supreme Court of Alabama